Langchenphu Gewog (Dzongkha: གླང་ཅན་ཕུ་) is a gewog (village block) of Samdrup Jongkhar District, Bhutan.

See also
Jomotsangkha

References 

Gewogs of Bhutan
Samdrup Jongkhar District